The Rev. Charles L. O'Donnell, C.S.C. (Nov. 15, 1884- Jun. 4, 1934) was an American Catholic priest, military chaplain of the US Army and President of the University of Notre Dame from 1928 to 1934. He served as military chaplain in World War I, and his helmet is still hanging on the east door in the Basilica of the Sacred Heart.

President of the University of Notre Dame 
Rev. O'Donnell appreciated both the academic vision and improvements of Cavanaugh and Burns and the practical consideration of Walsh, who greatly expanded facilities, and combined both aspects during his presidency. In 1929, he built the Notre Dame Stadium. He also restored Sacred Heart Church and constructed the law school building. In 1931, construction of Alumni and Dillon was begun, in addition to the Cushing Hall of Engineering and a new heating plant. This rapid expansion, which cost the University more than $2,800,000, was made possible in large part through football revenues. Academically, O'Donnell eliminated in 1929 the school for Minims, which created more room for college students. He actively sought distinguished lecturers throughout his presidency and attracted William Butler Yeats to visit campus. O'Donnell also established a new coat of arms and for the University, because he felt that the old one was indistinguishable from the seal of the Holy Cross order.

Awards

References

External links
 http://archives.nd.edu/hope/hope28.htm
 http://magazine.nd.edu/news/14882-time-and-again-an-appreciation-of-charles-l-o-donnell-csc/
 https://www.findagrave.com/memorial/45765256

Congregation of Holy Cross
1884 births
1934 deaths
20th-century American Roman Catholic priests
Catholics from Indiana
People from Greenfield, Indiana
Presidents of the University of Notre Dame
Recipients of the Order of the Crown (Italy)
World War I chaplains
20th-century American academics